Jack Massey (born 12 April 1993) is an English professional boxer who held the IBO cruiserweight title between 2021 and 2022.

Managed by - Kevin Maree (Maree Boxing)

Professional boxing career
His 16–0 undefeated streak earned Massey the chance to fight Richard Riakporhe for the vacant British cruiserweight title on 19 December 2021, at the York Hall in London, England. He lost the fight by unanimous decision, with scores of 115–113, 115–113 and 117–111.

After successfully bouncing back from his first professional loss, with a points win over Mohammad Farid, Massey faced Engin Karakaplan for the vacant IBF European cruiserweight title on 2 July 2021, at the Sheffield Arena Carpark in Sheffield, England. He captured the IBF regional silverware with a fourth-round knockout, flooring Karakaplan with a right-left combination.

Massey was booked to face Bilal Laggoune for the vacant IBO cruiserweight title on 26 November 2021, at the Whites Hotel in Bolton, England, in the main event of a Fightzone broadcast card. Massey made quick work of his opponent, as he won the fight by a third-round technical knockout. He first knocked Laggoune down with a left hook early in the third round, before forcing the referee to wave the bout off with a flurry of punches as soon as the fight resumed.

Professional boxing record

References

External links

Living people
1993 births
English male boxers
Sportspeople from Derbyshire
Cruiserweight boxers
International Boxing Organization champions